Rhopaltriplasia is a genus of moths belonging to the subfamily Olethreutinae of the family Tortricidae.

Species
Rhopaltriplasia anamilleta Diakonoff, 1973
Rhopaltriplasia insignata Kuznetzov, 1997
Rhopaltriplasia macrorhis Diakonoff, 1983
Rhopaltriplasia spinalis Yu & Li, 2005
Rhopaltriplasia trimelaena (Meyrick, 1922)

See also
List of Tortricidae genera

References

External links
Tortricid.net

Tortricidae genera
Olethreutinae
Taxa named by Alexey Diakonoff